Patrick Enrici (born 2 May 2001) is an Italian professional footballer who plays as a centre back for the  club Lecco.

Club career
Trained in Cuneo and Torino youth system, Enrici was signed by the Serie C club Sambenedettese for the 2020–21 season. He made his professional debut on 27 September 2020 against Carpi.

On 7 July 2021, he joined Lecco.

References

External links
 
 

2001 births
Living people
People from Cuneo
Footballers from Piedmont
Italian footballers
Association football defenders
Serie C players
Torino F.C. players
A.S. Sambenedettese players
Calcio Lecco 1912 players
Sportspeople from the Province of Cuneo